Lake Alajuela is an artificial lake in the Chagres River basin. The lake is bounded by the Madden Dam and linked to the Panama Canal. Lake Alajuela serves as a reservoir for the canal, which lies to the lake's southwest. 
It was created in 1935. The Chagres, Pequení, Boquerón, Salamanca, La Puente, Indio, Piedras, San Cristóbal and Escandaloso rivers flow into the lake. The rivers of Lake Alajuela contribute 45 percent of the total water for the canal.

The reservoir was formerly known as Madden Lake when the Canal Zone was under U.S. administration and was renamed after control of the canal reverted to Panama.

In early December 2010, Lake Alajuela reached its highest recorded water level, prompting authorities to close the Panama Canal for 17 hours. The canal reopened on December 9.

References 

Alajuela
Alajuela
Lakes